Jacaric acid  is a conjugated polyunsaturated fatty acid with a melting point of 44 °C. It occurs naturally in the seeds of the Jacaranda mimosifolia, which contain about 36% jacaric acid.

References

Fatty acids
Polyenes